The 1976–77 season was the 78th season for FC Barcelona.

La Liga

League table

Results

External links
www.fcbarcelona.cat Official Site

FC Barcelona seasons
Barcelona